Jack Staff is a comic book by the writer/artist Paul Grist, currently published by Image Comics. Its large supporting cast are based upon other British comics characters and archetypes, and its main character is the eponymous Jack Staff.

A slow-boiling plot line hints at a coming battle between two opposing groups, the Green and the Red, with the first hints occurring in Jack Staff vol. 1, #6. The Green was revealed to exist in Jack Staff: Soldiers (Vol. 2, #1-5) and the Red was named in Jack Staff vol. 2, #12. The apocalypse was first shown in Jack Staff Special #1, the final adversary in The Weird World of Jack Staff #1, and the prophesied champion revealed in Weird World #4.

The Freedom Fighters and foes

Loosely based on Marvel Comics' Invaders, the Freedom Fighters were a quartet of superhumans who fought for the Allies during World War II. Jack Staff was a member and default leader, though their team dynamic seems more equal. Their full story is unknown, but in 1942 they were decimated by the villain Brain Head. When asked what happened to Tommy Twister and Blazing Glory after that battle, Paul Grist said "Nothing good, I'm afraid."

Tommy Twister
A plucky teenager, he had an unexplained accident that turned him into a sentient wind current. He was forced to, literally, "pull himself together" and uses a containment suit to stay alive. Following the 1942 battle against Brain Head, his form was split up into four containers and it is unknown if he was ever put back together.

Blazing Glory

In 1919, she was found as a baby in the heart of a volcano. Adopted and raised by explorer Sommerset Stone, Gentlemen Adventurer, she has the mutant ability to burst into flame and secretes an oil that protects her from burns.

It is unknown what happened to her, though her father remained alive into the 21st Century before his death.

Sgt. States

"America's Fighting Footsoldier", the superhuman Nathan Hart served in the Freedom Fighters before America joined the war. While pleasant and heroic on the surface, deep down he believed the others were looking down at him. In 1940, he was transformed into a vampire and allowed his bitterness and the growing darkness within him to eventually consume him, though he managed to keep this a secret from the other Fighters. His transformation was known to the government who covered it up, replacing his Star-Spangled Kid sidekicks every time he ate one.

After the war, his death was faked and he was regularly dispatched to war zones to carry out America's interests; occasionally he'd escape for some fresh blood and would be apprehended by American special forces, who covered up the incidents. He took up a public role once more, with a cover story of having been frozen in ice for several decades, and deliberately attacked Castletown in order to draw out Jack Staff and have petty revenge on him for imagined slights. He was defeated but remains an agent of the US government.

Templar Richards
An ancient and evil vampire who had originally been a knight templar, Richards used the Castletown Blitz of 1940 as a cover for killing the occasional civilian. The Freedom Fighters tracked down and stopped him, but didn't know he'd bitten Sgt. States; Nathan brutally killed him out of anger and loathing.

Brain Head
A highly intelligent, arrogant, and misanthropic dwarf, he was an old enemy of Jack Staff's who committed crimes simply to get back at his academic peers for mocking some of his work. In 1942 he turned to the Nazis, constructing a teleportation device so they could cross the English Channel. He was promised the body of Kapitan Kreig as payment. He managed to defeat the entire Freedom Fighters team with the help of Kreig, but was defeated when the German superhuman turned on him. While no civilian name was given, Jack Staff refers to him as "Brian" at one point.

Kapitan Kreig
Formerly a teacher named Hans Gruber, he underwent experimentation to become the superhuman Kapitan Kreig ("The Man With Indestructible Skin!") and defend Germany. He battled Staff and the Freedom Fighters on an unknown number of occasions until, in 1942, he discovered he had been made a superhuman in order to be the physical vessel of a powerful demon. He was forced to carry it, gaining a boost in his powers in the process. He was then sent to assist Brain Head and battle the Freedom Fighters; he outwitted the scientist by pretending to not understand or speak English, being underestimated as a result. Turning on him, he tried to use the teleportation device to kill himself and prevent the demon from coming out.

He was instead warped into the present day, facing off against Jack Staff again outside Tesco. With the demon taking full control, he decimated Castletown's heroes before committing suicide in the hope of stopping the monster.

A form of mutual respect existed between Jack Staff and Kapitan Kreig. While a patriot, Kreig is established as not having been a Nazi; ironically, he got a splash page in #11 (Vol.2) with bombastic text presenting him as Golden Age superhero, which is how he (and presumably Germany) saw him at the time.

Q
Investigators of the unexplainable and dealing in "question mark crimes", they are a constant presence in the comic whenever supernatural events occur. They are officially a special branch of the police and operate out a basement HQ in Castletown police station, and can be identified by their green trench coats. Unofficially, they are primary agents of the Green. Jack Staff #6 (Vol.2) had Zipper Nolan discover a room full of dangerous relics and objects recovered from Q's cases, including Mr. Green's cloak and shards of the Valiant Stone. In The Weird World of Jack Staff #1, Helen Morgan stated that this room was an arsenal — Paul Grist has stated the arsenal "doesn't belong to Q." Their headquarters is portrayed as an always-dark void with green doors, as well as mysterious windows which might possibly have a dream-related function; gravity and direction seem entirely arbitrary within its walls.

Ben Kulmer

Originally he was called Karl Stringer, an amoral small-time thief. Under orders from the mysterious Mister Mason, he stole a metal glove called the Claw from a museum; an accident bonded it to his hand, giving him the power to turn invisible (except for the glove) and deliver electric shocks. He was drafted by Q, who gave him a "get out of jail free card" and a new identity, and he spent a year as an agent keeping to the shadows and out of trouble.

Recognised by another thief named Alex, Kulmer stole some money to pay him to forget he'd seen him. He then decided to throw a scare into Alex instead, but ended up dropping the man deliberately to his death and keeping the money. He has shown no guilt about this, and has started to occasionally commit robberies to "keep his hand in". In the issue where he dropped Alex, it was hinted he is drifting towards the Red. In The Weird World Of Jack Staff, he states to himself that he has no idea why he keeps returning to crime: "it's like I hear this voice inside my head and suddenly I'm not listening to anything else". Whether this refers to a psychological problem or having an outside entity literally talking in his head is unknown.

His thefts caused him to be tracked and captured by the deranged Somerset Stone, Gentlemen Adventurer, only for Mason to arrive. Mason and his hired assassin killed Stone and tried to take the Claw (along with Kulmer's arm). The Claw itself prevented them, and Kulmer murdered Mason.

In Jack Staff Special #1, Jack Staff had a seemingly prophetic dream of a powerful villain who will kill Helen Morgan and Tom Tom the Robot Man, an event linked to some great apocalypse — and the end of that issue hinted this villain will be Ben Kulmer, and is his inescapable destiny. It is later revealed that this villain, the Black Warrior, existed in the ancient past and upon his death, his armour was split up to prevent him from coming back to life. The Claw was one of the Warrior's gloves, and Kulmer has also recently stolen the Warrior's old sword.

He likes Harry Crane, but considers him a bit of a Boy Scout.

A left-hand version of the Claw exists in Q's arsenal.

Harry Crane
A quiet psychic who sees echoes of past events, Crane was originally a policeman and partner to Maveryk. He hid his abilities until an encounter with Helen Morgan and a cursed mirror, which saw him drafted into Q. He sees the best in everyone, and is troubled by having to see visions of murders that nobody stopped and that he can't intervene in; he used to be religiously devout but the visions have caused him to "[not] remember what God looks like anymore." He used to be a husband and father, and it is unknown what happened to his family. In the battle of Tesco, he was struck by Kapitan Kreig and lost an eye.

With the shift to Jack Staff being in full colour, it was revealed Harry is Black.

Helen Morgan

An enigmatic Welsh woman and senior member of Q, few members of the cast know anything about her. She has undefined magical–psychic abilities, including precognition, mind control, psychic projections and the ability to halt time; due to possessing a shard of the Valiant Stone, she returns from the dead every time she is killed. In a recurring dreamscape, it was revealed she is a direct agent of Mister Green and can only escape immortality if she collects all the shards of the Valiant Stone; issue #6 (Vol. 2) showed a vast number of the shards are in Q custody.  Issue #12 (Vol.2) showed her directly communicating with the Green. She has been shown directly stocking the arsenal of Q's recovered weapons and outright recruiting Hurricane as a Green agent.

She privately loathes being immortal and a pawn of the Green, but covers this up.

She is highly unpopular with DI Maveryk and also with Jack Staff after she hypnotised him to use him as a tool against the Word. Following this, he realised who she was working for ("You're Green!").

Wilbur
A cheery talking skull of unknown origin.

Castletown heroes and residents

Becky Burdock, Vampire Reporter
A cynical and easily irritated journalist, she worked for a major newspaper before her career was deliberately destroyed and the only job she could get was with the sleazy tabloid The World's Press; she is often frustrated with this position. While researching the disappearance of Jack Staff and the recent vampire murders around Castletown, she was attacked by Sgt. States and transformed into a vampire. Somehow maintaining her mind, she tries to continue her life as if nothing happened and keeps stating she's no longer going to be involved in Jack Staff's weird world, but is constantly being drawn into superhero situations anyway.

When she was a toddler, she was caught in the battle between Jack Staff, British army project Weapon H, and Hurricane. Her memories of this have been covered over, along with those of many other people, thanks to the actions of Mister Green. She used to have a stuffed toy called Mista Bunny, last seen in Green's hands, and in issue #7 (Vol.2) mentioned a dream about her shadow murdering a field of bunnies. In issue #15, she had a nightmare of encountering a malevolent "Shadow Monster" as a child.

A conspiracy has developed around her — a vampire prophecy about her was revealed (and fulfilled) in issue #9 (Vol.2), the mysterious Man of Shadow is trying to get her to join him, and she has recurring nightmares about being part of and recruited by something undefined and horrible. It is presumed the Red is trying to recruit her but the reason why is unknown; presumably also, her red hair and nickname "Red" has been a long-term hint about this in the same way Q's trench coats tied into the Green. The Red appears to be trying to keep Jack Staff & Becky separate, with the Man of Shadow specifically telling her after helping that "the superhero" hadn't arrived to help her and something "in the shadows" laughing after they were separated just before she told him of her nightmares. Recently, to get the Man of Shadow to save Harold Bramble's life, she had to agree to do a favour for him at a later date.

The Weird World of Jack Staff revealed that Becky is, in fact, the Green's chosen champion, meant to wield the Sword of Devastation in the battle at the end of the world.  Jack Staff's destined role is to keep Becky alive until she can become the champion.

Detective Inspector Maveryk
A self-described "old-fashioned copper", the belligerent DI Maveryk has a low tolerance for anything strange or supernatural, and yet is always being drawn into the adventures of Jack Staff and Q. He tries to dogmatically solve crimes by old-fashioned means (often by shouting) and in one case deliberately destroyed evidence showing Jack Staff was framed in order to "keep things simple" and go with a gut instinct. He heavily dislikes Helen Morgan, who represents everything he dislikes.

Detective Sergeant "Zipper" Nolan (and his Gang)
 for further information, see the Lion strip, Zip Nolan—Highway Patrol
Maveryk's current partner, Nolan is a more laid-back character with an interest in comics and fantasy fiction.

When he was a small child, he was recruited by the Druid and a gang of dream beings — Mister Balloons, Dish and Spoon, and Goldie (a goldfish) — to help liberate the Land of Nod from the bogeyman Jim Bones, using his small size and speed to "zip" into Nod's castle and wake him. Zipper and his gang went on to have many adventures throughout his childhood. Flashbacks have shown he had an abusive father.

He accidentally wandered into Q's arsenal in #6 (Vol.2); Paul Grist has hinted that this is a sign that something is unusual about Nolan. This would be shown when Zipper Nolan's imaginary pals returned, this time manifesting in reality to assist him. Only he can see them. In issue #20, Mister Balloons manifested to help him, and later vanished when Nolan wouldn't let him use a gun; this time, the psychic villain Head Master saw them. When Head Master invaded Nolan's mind to steal this power, he was reduced to a gibbering, terrified wreck by something horrible within Nolan's mind.

Bramble & Son, Vampire Hunters

Rag-and-bone men by day and dubiously competent vampire hunters by night, they have repeatedly run into Becky Burdock in their fight against the undead. Albert Bramble first encountered vampires during the Castletown Blitz when he was ten years old; after being rescued from a bomb site by Sgt. States, he discovered his mother was dead from unknown means. Trying to find out what happened, he witnessed the battle between Templar Richards and the Freedom Fighters and saved Jack Staff's life.

Now a crotchety old man, he has raised his son Harold to also hunt vampires — "the family trade". Harold would prefer to have a normal life and clashes with his father over the business, especially over their finances; it is a sore point that their daily trade which funds vampire hunting is rag-and-bone men, "the only job that pays less than vampire hunting". He has a massive infatuation with Becky Burdock, something that causes endless clashes between him and his father.

In issue #13, an alternate reality was shown where Albert was a dangerous vampire; this version of Bramble ended up in the regular Castletown, and in #15 drew the living Albert into battle against him.  He almost killed Albert and, later, Harold as well, and Becky had to make a deal with the Man of Shadow to get Albert brought back. Rocky Reality stepped in at the last moment to erase one of the Albert's to preserve reality; while the vampire was the one that was erased, Albert was shown afterward to be dreaming of blood.

Commander Hawkes and Unit D
Established in 1962 to handle "super-crooks," Unit D operated out of the supersonic Thunder Ship and had multiple battles against the Spider — which the Spider always seemed to win. Members included Clive Horton (intelligence), Peggy James (surveillance systems), Russell Carthy (scientific genius), Sandra Lee (weapons expert), Terry Stringer (unarmed combat), and (after 1964) Jack Staff. They were shut down in 1986 after failing to stop the Spider rob the Bank of England.

Commander Hawkes, Unit D commander and possessor of a strength-enhancing metal glove called the Power Fist, continued to fight crime with the Thunder Ship after Unit D was closed down. He has a slightly frosty relationship with Jack Staff, saying that "when it comes to the crunch, he won't be there" — this may refer to a past event or imply Hawke is part of the Green. At some point, he lost his left arm.

Tom Tom the Robot Man

Neither a robot nor a man, crippled teenager Patricia Carthy is the daughter of Russell Carthy and Sandra Lee and inherited her father's scientific genius. When she was eleven, they were murdered and she completed & piloted her father's prototype robot-armour to bring the murderers to justice. As Tom Tom the Robot Man, she became Castletown's premier defender, racking up a rogues' gallery with members like Doc Tempest and Shock and also working alongside both Q and the regular police. The suit was destroyed in battle against Sgt. States and later rebuilt; she has recently started working on a remote-controlled Tom. She has her own base, borrowed from the Four Good Guys.

Patricia highly enjoys working as Tom Tom, especially the speed, but has several times lost her temper to a spectacular degree, such as when Helen Morgan was killed (later recovering).

Alfred Chinard

An elderly man enjoying his retirement, he is secretly the notorious master criminal known as the Spider, the King of Crooks, who battled Unit D and Jack Staff on many occasions (never being seen face to face). A frighteningly powerful intellect and completely amoral, though allegedly never killing anyone, he briefly went out as the Spider again for a minor job at the end of vol. 1. In #14, it was shown someone unknown is trying to recruit him for something.

Due to DC Comics/Wildstorm buying the copyright to the Spider, in his future Jack Staff appearances he will only be called Alfred Chinard.

Hurricane

Highly aggressive Captain Gust suffered from psychotic rages, physically growing larger & stronger each time. After getting in trouble for injuring half a dozen allied soldiers in the 1980s, he was seconded to the Weapon H military project; an early experiment to turn up his "rage attacks" transformed him into an unintelligible rampaging hulk. In an attempt to recruit him, Mister Green engineered his escape from military custody and he devastated Castletown before Jack Staff stopped him by draining out his rage & spreading it over Castletown.

Captain Gust wandered the streets as a homeless man for twenty years, until the redirected "rage force" began to infect the Castletown population and cause an increasing number of violent "rage attacks". Helen Morgan reversed the original process by redirecting the rage back into Gust, turning him back into Hurricane; he was taken into Q custody and it was hinted he was recruited to the Green.

Commander Stewart
Liz Stewart, Secret Military Intelligence Lethal Executive (S.M.I.L.E.), worked as a colonel on the Weapon H project. Currently working for military intelligence, it has been suggested she possesses the same "rage force" as Hurricane, only in a controllable form.

The Starfall Squad
The United Kingdom has a secret space program, and science experiments that go apocalyptically wrong are launched into space in satellites to get rid of them. To handle the satellites that come back to Earth and also general alien activity, the British government set up the Starfall Squad; while technically protecting the country, they've been shown to use amoral tactics such as attempting to wipe out ("sterilise") the population of an infected village.

Their members are: George, a large and physically strong being of unknown species and origin; Dr Anne Dromeda, a xenoscientist from Ipswich; and Colonel Adam Venture, "Britain's first man in space (not that you'll find that in any official record!)".

Lynda Jones, Calendar Girl
A local model who does pin-up calendars, who appeared to have a romantic interest in Staff. After the series was rebooted as Weird World of Jack Staff, she was revealed to also be a Clock Cop: a time-traveller who made sure the timestream wasn't altered. Lynda says that's why she's called Calendar Girl, though everyone else thought it was because she appears on calendars (she admits this makes more sense). She showed Jack a vision of the future apocalypse and told him he was the epicenter of a "time flux point" that would decide the outcome; she then did something to his mind to try to keep the knowledge of Becky's destiny from being taken from him, in an attempt to stop the flux.

Charlie Raven

The self-styled greatest escapologist of the Victorian Age, he was an arrogant celebrity performer and part-time crimefighter. He ended up trapped underground and survived into the early 21st Century by slowing his breathing down.

Supernatural entities

Mister Green
A being of unknown power clad in green rags, he is Helen Morgan's "employer" and a sort-of ally of Jack Staff's during the 1980s. His sole motivation is to keep the Green strong and ensure it can win the war against the Red; to this extent he has done things like deliberately freeing Hurricane in the hope of recruiting him, leading to the devastation of Castletown. He tried to have Jack Staff as the Green's champion but Staff eventually quit, both as Mister Green's champion and as a superhero, after realising Mister Green fought solely because he enjoyed fighting. The other champion Green chose was Becky Burdock, and in scenes from the end of the world, she's wearing his cloak.

Helen Morgan's dreams show he wants to gather the fragments of the Valiant Stone — an image from the future in #13 suggests this is intended to bring an unknown person back, and that this will mean "everybody dies"...

The Man of Shadow
Known to Jack Staff, he is literally a man made out of shadow and has undefined powers based around that. He has hounded Becky Burdock three times, trying to recruit her to his side of a coming War (presumably the Red) and isolate her from Jack Staff. The third time, in return for saving the Brambles, he succeeded in getting her to agree to do a favour for him later.

In one of Jack Staff's dreams, Jack and the Man of Shadow recognise each other and appear to be old enemies.

The Druid
A mysterious magical figure, the Druid can see across all realities — including to us reading the comic. He has been seen in the Land of Nod, recruiting a young Nolan to fight Jim Bones; as a character in a comic book in the Staff universe; in the "real world" of the comic where he defeated the Word, only to be banished when the page was turned by us; and also in a straitjacket in a mental institution.

In #15, an unknown entity stripped him of his ability to see across realities and trapped him in his asylum form. He escaped, gained his cloak and has made contact with Zipper Nolan — the discovery he's also a fictional comic character caused him to scream "I have failed! The world is lost!" He is now living at Nolan's house.

The full story of what he is remains unknown.

Lord Nod

The ruler of the land of dreams.

Rocky Reality
A Temporal Reality Agent and chimpanzee, Rocky is tasked to ensure reality remains the way it is supposed to and fix any changes to it. He works outside of reality, which is depicted as him standing outside of the normal comic panels. He has his own theme song ("when reality's out of whack, Rocky Reality whacks it back!").

In #12 (Vol.2), Morlan the Mystic commented, "Everyone's taking sides — moneys, rabbits, everything," implying Rocky was going to be taking a side in the Green/Red conflict.

Mister Bones
A sadistic bogeyman, he imprisoned Lord Nod and terrorised the Land of Dreams before the young Zipper stopped him. In issue #20, he manifested in Castletown.

"The demon with the face of an angel"
Future visions shown in The Weird World of Jack Staff have shown the final battle at the end of the world: the Valiant Stone's bearer, a handsome man referred to as a monster "with the face of an angel", will kill his way across the Earth. Only Burdock will be capable of stopping him, though Jack Staff will attempt it. In #5 of Weird World, he was accidentally warped to the present day.

See also 
 Albion

Notes

References

External links
Jack Staff at Paul Grist Comics Index
Jack Staff's cast at International Superheroes
Jack Staff discussion forum at Image comics

British comics
Image Comics superheroes